Termini Station may refer to:

 Roma Termini railway station, a train station in Rome,
 Termini Station, a Canadian drama film released in 1989.